Rabbit is a Japanese band that was formed in 2012. Its line-up consists of Ai Otsuka (vocals, chorus), Toshiyuki Mori (keyboard), Watusi (bass guitar), Taiji Satou (guitar, vocals, and chorus), Takashi Numazawa (drums), and Sasuga Minami (chorus, motion). The band made its debut with their studio album Rabito (lit. Naked People), which was released on 12 December 2012 and peaked at No. 61 on the Japanese Oricon weekly album chart. The album includes a version of the song "Moonlight", which was originally on Ai Otsuka's mini-album Love It.

Discography

Studio album

References

External links
 Official website

Ai Otsuka
2012 establishments in Japan
Musical groups established in 2012
Japanese pop music groups
Musical groups from Tokyo